Perkeo of Heidelberg (born Clemens Pankert, according to other sources Giovanni Clementi; 1702–1735) was a notable jester and court dwarf of Elector Palatine Charles III Philip in Heidelberg. As guardian of the Great Heidelberg Tun, he has since become an unofficial mascot of the city and region. His name, story and image have been connected with a variety of festivals, traditional songs, cultural and scientific institutions, hotels, restaurants and private companies (in and out of the region) ever since.

Life

Pankert was apparently affected by dwarfism, possibly pseudoachondroplasia. He was born in Salurn in the County of Tyrol (present-day Salorno, South Tyrol) and originally practised as a button maker. Probably about 1718 he met with Prince Charles III Philip, who since 1712 ruled as a Habsburg governor over the lands of Tyrol and Further Austria. Philip took an interest in Pankert, and when he assumed the rule in the Electoral Palatinate, he brought him along to Heidelberg Castle as a cup-bearer and official entertainer for the court.

In Heidelberg, he allegedly adopted the nickname “Perkeo” for his drinking habitudes, as he famously replied "perché no?" (“why not?” in Italian) many times after being asked if he wanted another glass of wine at various court events. Perkeo quickly became celebrated for massive wine consumption despite his small figure, maybe on account of diabetes insipidus. Contemporary accounts document that he regularly drank between five and eight US gallons of wine a day. Since he knew much about wine, he was also given the responsibility of looking after the castle’s wine stocks. Many found amusement in the striking contrast that tiny, funny Perkeo was in charge of the largest wine barrel in the world, the massive Heidelberg Tun, while famously having a strong love of drinking.

Aside from his official court duties, he is often celebrated for a variety of humorous legends connected to his life, his repartee and comical court pranks. These stories range from a tale of a mysterious clock that he used in wine production, a large key he had gotten on a misadventure into town to have an official uniform created, and most famously his demise. According to popular legend, Perkeo lived happily into his eighties having never drunk anything in his life, save for wine. Yet one day he took ill and the town doctor had him drink water. He died the next day.

Reception

Perkeo's fate was perpetuated in a letter by Victor Hugo (1802–1885), after his 1840 visit to Heidelberg Castle. Joseph Victor von Scheffel (1826–1886) added Perkeo's drinking song to his Gaudeamus collection, published in 1863. In Heidelberg, his commemoration is annually celebrated during the carnival (Fastnacht) season, likewise in Salorno (Maschggra).

The trademark PERKÊO for lamp components was registered under No. 1 by the German Imperial Patent Office on 16 October 1894 and is protected up to today. Perkeo is also the name of a historic inn in Heidelberg and of a Hedera helix (ivy) variety named in 1982. The PERKEO group at the Institute of Physics of the Heidelberg University examines free neutron decay.

Further reading
 Harry B. Davis: "What Happened in Heidelberg: From Heidelberg Man to the Present": Verlag Brausdruck GmbH, 1977.
 Victor Hugo: "Heidelberg" of Frankfurt am Main: Societäts-Verlag, 2003.

References

External links 
 Heidelberg Institute of Physics

18th-century German people
18th-century Austrian people
Jesters
People from Salurn
People from Heidelberg
German people of Austrian descent
1702 births
1735 deaths